Otto Adler is the president of the Jewish Association of Romania, a Holocaust survivor and a polyglot. He can speak fluently in Romanian, Hebrew, English, French, German, Hungarian and Russian.

Early life
He was born in 1929 into a large Jewish family from Cluj. In 1953 he graduated at the Mechanical Faculty from the Politehnica University of Bucharest where he taught until 1994. During 1961 - 1991 he worked at the Metallurgic Research Institute from Bucharest.

World War II
During World War II Otto Adler was a prisoner at the Auschwitz-Birkenau camp. He was 15 years old when he arrived at the camp but despite a frail appearance managed to avoid certain death by answering that his real age was 17 when asked by the guards. This advice was received from the other inmates because everyone under the age of 13 was sent to the gas chamber along with those under 17 years which weren't considered physically fit. He weighed 70 kg when he arrived, but had only 29 kg when he left the camp.

After the war
He was awarded the Order of the Star of Romania in 2007. When talking about antisemitism in Romania Mr Adler declared:

References

External links
 The Jewish Association of Romania official page
 2007 Interview
 2009 Interview

Living people
20th-century Romanian Jews
21st-century Romanian Jews
Transylvanian Jews
Nazi concentration camp survivors
Recipients of the Order of the Star of Romania
People from Cluj-Napoca
Academic staff of the Politehnica University of Bucharest
Politehnica University of Bucharest alumni
Year of birth missing (living people)